Gently My Songs Entreat is a 1933 Austrian-German musical film directed by Willi Forst and starring Marta Eggerth, Luise Ullrich and Hans Jaray. The film was shot at the Sievering Studios in Vienna with art direction by Julius von Borsody. The film is a biopic of the composer Franz Schubert (1797–1828). It was Forst's directorial debut. A British version was made called Unfinished Symphony. The German title refers to the first line of the Lied "Ständchen" (Serenade) from Schubert's collection Schwanengesang, "the most famous serenade in the world",<ref>{{AllMusic|class=composition|id=0002448706|label=Franz Schubert: "Ständchen" ("Leise flehen meine Lieder"), song for voice & piano (Schwanengesang), D. 957/4|first=James|last=Leonard|accessdate=13 July 2014}}</ref> which Eggerth performs in the film.

Cast
 Marta Eggerth as Countess Eszterhazy
 Luise Ullrich as Emmi Passenter
 Hans Jaray as Franz Schubert
 Hans Moser as pawnbroker Passenter
 Otto Treßler as Count Esterhazy
 Hans Olden as Hüttenbrener
 Raoul Aslan as Salieri
 Blanka Glossy as Schubert's landlady
 Anna Kallina as Countess Kinsky
  as Lieutenant Folliot
 Gucki Wippel as Maria
Ernst Arndt
Karl Forest

 References 

 Bibliography 
 Dassanowsky, Robert. World Film Locations: Vienna. Intellect Books, 2012. 
 Hake, Sabine. Popular Cinema of the Third Reich''. University of Texas Press, 2001.

External links 
 
 , Schubert's song, sung by Marta Eggerth

1933 films
1933 musical films
1930s biographical films
Austrian musical films
Austrian biographical films
German musical films
German biographical films
Films of the Weimar Republic
Films directed by Willi Forst
Films set in the 1820s
Films set in Vienna
Films about classical music and musicians
German multilingual films
Cultural depictions of Franz Schubert
Films about composers
Cine-Allianz films
Austrian black-and-white films
German black-and-white films
1933 multilingual films
Austrian multilingual films
1930s German films
Films shot at Sievering Studios